The Alfa Romeo Canguro is a concept car designed by Giorgetto Giugiaro at Bertone. The car is based on the chassis of an Alfa Romeo TZ and was shown at the 1964 Paris Motor Show. The body is made of fiberglass rather than aluminium and it features one of the first glued in windscreens in a car. The name "Canguro" means Kangaroo in Italian.

History 
The Canguro was designed as a possible concept for a roadgoing version of the Alfa Romeo Giulia TZ which had been recently successful in racing. Alfa Romeo had given one TZ chassis each to rival design houses Pininfarina and Bertone to see who could make the better design. The Canguro was Bertone's entry, designed by Giorgetto Giugiaro. The concept was well received but Alfa Romeo never produced the design, many speculate this is because they didn't have the capacity at the time to build the bodies for the Canguro. The Canguro suffered a front end collision with the 1963 Chevrolet Testudo, another Bertone concept, while on track at the Monza circuit. The damage was deemed too great to fix by Nuccio Bertone and the car was left to sit outside Bertone's factory. The car was later restored and made its debut at the 2005 Ville d’Este Concours d’Elegance where it was voted "Best of show".

Technical specifications

Engine: 4 cylinders in-line, 2 valves per cylinder
configuration: front longitudinally
displacement: 1570 cc
power: 
chassis: steel space frame, TZ-derived
transmission: rear-wheel drive
gearbox: 5-speed manual
Chassis number: 10511 AR 750101

References 

Canguro
Cars introduced in 1964
Bertone vehicles